Free-market democracy, consumer's democracy, or the market's economic democracy, is an economic state of affairs where the power to dispose of the means of production, belonging to the entrepreneurs and capitalists, can only be acquired by means of the consumers' ballot, held daily in the market-place. There is no equality
of vote in this democracy; some have plural votes. But the greater voting power which the disposal of a greater income implies can only be acquired and maintained by the test of election. Examples of free-market democracy are laissez-faire capitalism or anarcho-capitalism, where votes are represented by the voluntary interaction of free people subject to the self-ownership and the non-aggression principle. In case of monetary exchange interactions this is sometimes referred to as dollar voting. In these economic systems, in contrast to ballot votes in political democracy, every voter gets to vote at any and all time and for any one willing to accept votes. Some people just get to cast more votes than others, because they received more votes.

The free-market democracy satisfies the Liberal democratic basic order definition of democracy, take for example Liberland, because:
 This political system allows for elections of representatives of parliament (composed of multiple members/parties) under universal suffrage of citizens, and parliamentary voting to establish a government. This is commonly understood as self-determination of a nation.
 Parliamentary ratification of legislation by large majority is required. All legal rules/laws, whether legislative, statutory or adjudicative, must satisfy the right to self-ownership and the non-aggression principle. Therefore the political participation system is free from political tyranny, and the economic participation system is free from economic tyranny like for example economic totalitarianism.
 Many liberal or libertarian human rights follow from the principles of self-ownership, non-aggression and liberty of action only restricted by the non-aggression principle. This includes: (1) the right to life, understood as self-ownership, prohibition on aggressive homicide, the right to self-defense and the parental care duty; and (2) the right to free development, understood as the right to own property, and right to establish contract, commonly called economic liberty.
 The political system implements the separation of powers, including judicial system with judges elected by the judicial election council, whose members are representatives from and elected by respectively, the council, the executive government, and direct by the people, establishing judicial independence. The authorities of the state's powers follow only form the constitution specifying the administrative law. The justice system allows for private prosecution of all individuals including state members establishing government accountability.
 Political parties are not subsidized by the state and every member has the equal right of voluntary exchange to receive party support establishing the 'equal chances' interpretation of 'equal opportunity' for parties.

Free-market democrats also characterized as libertarians are therefore not anti-democratic, both in the sense of the above definition and as a type of democracy.

References

Free market
Macroeconomic theories